Formyl fluoride is the organic compound with the formula HC(O)F.

Preparation
HC(O)F was first reported in 1934.  Among the many preparations, a typical one involves the reaction of  sodium formate with benzoyl fluoride (generated in situ from KHF2 and benzoyl chloride):

HCOONa +  C6H5C(O)F  →  FC(O)H  +  C6H5COONa

Structure
The molecule is planar; C-O and C-F distances are 1.18 and 1.34 A, respectively.

Reactions
HC(O)F decomposes autocatalytically near room temperature to carbon monoxide and hydrogen fluoride:

HC(O)F  →  HF  +  CO

Because of the compound's sensitivity, reactions are conducted at low temperatures and samples are often stored over anhydrous alkali metal fluorides, e.g. potassium fluoride which absorbs HF.

Benzene (and other arenes) react with formyl fluoride in the presence of boron trifluoride to give benzaldehyde.  In a related reaction, formyl chloride is implicated in Gattermann-Koch formylation reaction.  The reaction of formyl fluoride/BF3 with perdeuteriobenzene (C6D6) exhibits a kinetic isotope effect of 2.68, similar to the isotope effect observed in Friedel-Crafts acetylation of benzene.  Formylation of benzene with a mixture of CO and hexafluoroantimonic acid however, exhibits no isotope effect (C6H6 and C6D6 react at the same rate), indicating that this reaction involves a more reactive formylating agent, possibly CHO+.

Formyl fluoride undergoes the reactions expected of an acyl halide: alcohols and carboxylic acids are converted to formate esters and mixed acid anhydrides, respectively.

References

Acyl fluorides
Substances discovered in the 1930s